Justin Brady is a British actor who is best known for playing Billy in The Lakes, James Dewar in Peak Practice, a paramedic in Holby City and he has guest starred in Shameless.

External links
 http://www.tv.com/the-lakes/show/16792/episode.html?printable=1 
 

Year of birth missing (living people)
Living people
British male television actors
Place of birth missing (living people)